The Aral–Caspian Depression is a lowland depression straddling Europe and Asia around the Aral Sea and Northern Caspian Sea. The most northern part is called the Caspian Depression. The desert part to the east of the Caspian Depression and Caspian is called the Turan Depression. In Azerbaijan, the Kura-Aras Lowland is part of the Aral–Caspian Depression. Its parts lie in Azerbaijan, Russia, Kazakhstan, Uzbekistan, and Turkmenistan.

References

George Frederick Wright (1902) Asiatic Russia, Chapter "Aral-Caspian Depression" (at Google Books)

Depressions of Russia
Depressions of Kazakhstan
Depressions of Uzbekistan
Depressions of Turkmenistan
Depressions of Azerbaijan
Caspian Sea
Aral Sea
Depressions of Europe
Endorheic basins of Asia